Gervatius Uri Khob (born 3 April 1972) is a retired Namibian footballer.

Club career
He has played for Chief Santos.

International career
Nicknamed Gerros the Bomber, the prolific striker competed for the Namibia national football team from 1992–1998, including the 1998 African Cup of Nations, where he scored two goals in a 3-3 draw with Angola.

References

1972 births
Living people
Namibian men's footballers
Namibia international footballers
1998 African Cup of Nations players
Chief Santos players
Association football forwards